Adrada de Pirón is a municipality located in the province of Segovia, Castile and León, Spain. According to the 2004 census (INE), the municipality had a population of 47 inhabitants.

Legends 

 Legend of the Tuerto de Pirón. El Tuerto de Pirón was a bandit born in the neighboring town of Santo Domingo de Pirón. Fernando Delgado Sanz, nicknamed El Tuerto de Pirón, robbed the rich, raided churches and roads, Adrada de Pirón was one of the places where he performed the most.

References

Municipalities in the Province of Segovia